The Fast Breeder Reactor-600 (FBR-600) or Indian Fast Breeder Reactor (IFBR) or Commercial Fast Breeder Reactor (CFBR) is a 600-MWe fast breeder nuclear reactor design presently being designed as part of India's three-stage nuclear power programme to commercialise the Prototype Fast Breeder Reactor built at Kalpakkam. The Indira Gandhi Centre for Atomic Research (IGCAR) is responsible for the design of this reactor as a successor for Prototype Fast Breeder Reactor (PFBR). The 1st twin unit would come up within the BHAVINI premises at Madras Atomic Power Station at Kalpakkam, close to the PFBR site itself.

Designed to "burn" a mixture of uranium oxide and plutonium oxide to generate 600 MWe of power each, current plans involve building six units, co-locating two at any given place. This arrangement would facilitate cost-rationalisation, using common auxiliaries to serve both reactors.

Design features 
According to the research conducted at IGCAR, the improved design concepts indicated significant economic advantages by reducing material inventory by 25%, simplifying fuel handling scheme and by reducing manufacture time with enhanced safety parameters.

Safety features 
CFBR designs mentions a new and improved decay heat removal (DHR) system, reactor shutdown system from its predecessor PFBR. Passive safety features include new hydraulically suspended absorber rods (HSAR) which fall into the core under the influence of gravity if coolant flow is lost, and the inclusion of an ultimate shutdown system (USD) which would use pressurized gas to forcefully inject neutron poisons directly into the core to halt re-criticality incidents.

Reactor fleet

See also 
 Prototype Fast Breeder Reactor
 India's three-stage nuclear power programme
 Advanced heavy-water reactor
 Bhabha Atomic Research Centre
 Fast Breeder Test Reactor
 BHAVINI

References

Liquid metal fast reactors
Nuclear power in India